Nicholas Lumbard or Lombard (died after 1368) was an Irish barrister and judge of the fourteenth century.

Family
He was a native of Waterford City. He was the son of Richard Lumbard, and probably a close relative of William Lumbard, who was four times Mayor of Waterford between 1377 and 1387. The family, as their name suggests, had come to Ireland from Lombardy, in northern Italy, in the thirteenth century. They became one of the most prominent families in Waterford, producing no less than nine Mayors of Waterford and giving their name to Lombard Street; perhaps the most notable family member was Peter Lombard (c.1555-1625), Archbishop of Armagh. One branch of the family founded Lombardstown, County Cork. Another branch moved to County Kilkenny.

Career 

Nicholas was Attorney-General for Ireland in 1345: he was one of the first known holders of the office. In 1356 he was appointed a Baron of the Court of Exchequer (Ireland), but the appointment was cancelled, apparently on the grounds that it was "a mistake". In 1360 he became second justice of the Court of King's Bench (Ireland), at a salary of 40 marks a year.

In 1364 Richard White, the Lord Chief Justice of Ireland, was sent by the Irish House of Commons to Westminster to present a report on "the true state of affairs in Ireland" and specifically to complain about maladministration by certain Crown officials. In White's absence Lumbard, as second justice, was acting Lord Chief Justice for 4 months. His date of death is not recorded. The last record of him seems to be in 1368, when he was still sitting on the King's Bench: the Council ordered him to be paid a half years arrears of his salary.

Descendants 

He was married with children, including the younger Nicholas and John (living 1375). A younger John Lumbard, also a judge of the Court of King's Bench, judge of assize for Leinster and Munster, and Deputy Constable of Ireland (died 1412) was his grandson, son of Nicholas the younger. In 1422 John de la Veer of County Kilkenny granted his manor of Ballykeff (Ballykeeffe) to John Lombard, son of Nicholas Lombard; this John was possibly a nephew of the judge.

References
Ball, F. Elrington The Judges in Ireland 1221-1921 John Murray London 1926
Calendar of Ormond Deeds 
Crooks, Peter "Hobbes", "Dogs", and Politics in the Ireland of Lionel of Antwerp c.1361-4 The Denis Bethell Prize Essay 2005
MacLysaght, Edward The Surnames of Ireland Irish University Press 1973
Patent Rolls Henry IV

Notes

People from Waterford (city)
Irish people of Italian descent
14th-century Irish judges
Attorneys-General for Ireland
Justices of the Irish King's Bench